Andrej Kotnik (born 4 August 1995) is a Slovenian professional footballer who plays as a midfielder for Slovenian PrvaLiga club Koper.

Club career
Kotnik made his Slovenian PrvaLiga debut for Gorica on 18 July 2015 in a game against Olimpija Ljubljana.

He made his Serie A debut for Crotone on 5 February 2017 as a 61st-minute substitute for Marcello Trotta in a 1–0 loss to Palermo.

References

External links
 
 NZS profile 

Living people
1995 births
People from Nova Gorica
Association football midfielders
Slovenian footballers
ND Gorica players
F.C. Crotone players
SD Formentera players
NK Maribor players
FC Koper players
Slovenian PrvaLiga players
Serie A players
Segunda División B players
Slovenian expatriate footballers
Slovenian expatriate sportspeople in Italy
Expatriate footballers in Italy
Slovenian expatriate sportspeople in Spain
Expatriate footballers in Spain